Renée Watson (born July 29, 1978) is an American teaching artist and author of children's books, best known for her award-winning and New York Times bestselling young adult novel Piecing Me Together, for which she received the John Newbery Honor, Coretta Scott King Author Award, and Bank Street Children's Book Committee's Josette Frank Award for fiction. Watson founded the nonprofit I, Too, Arts Collective to provide creative arts programs to the Harlem community.

Early life 
Watson was born in Paterson, New Jersey and grew up in northeast Portland, Oregon after her parents' divorce. Her mother's family is originally from West Virginia. Watson attended Vernon Elementary School, Binnsmead Middle School, and Jefferson High School in Portland Oregon. She was a member of Antioch Missionary Baptist Church where she recited poetry on holidays and special occasions. She loved poetry from a young age and read the work of poets like Maya Angelou and Langston Hughes. When she first read poems by Hughes in elementary school, Watson felt a strong connection to them and sense of herself, her family, and her neighbors reflected in his work. Sandra Cisneros' The House on Mango Street was one of the formative works of her childhood. From a young age, she knew she was interested in writing and was encouraged to pursue this by her teachers and family. In middle school, she wanted to be a lawyer for a time. This was also when she wrote her first play, which her middle school produced as their spring show. While in high school she participated in a mentorship and has since returned to mentor others at her former high school. As a senior she also assisted in teaching poetry to underclassmen. Watson describes herself as a teaching artist, having spent twenty years teaching poetry and theater before becoming a novelist. She moved to New York in 2005 where she attended The New School to study creative writing and art therapy. While she was in school she published her first book. In the future she hopes to publish adult fiction and poetry books in addition to her young adult and children's books.

Career

Teaching 
Watson has spent over 20 years as a teaching artist throughout the country. She has partnered with outside organizations to lead workshops and to be an artist in residence at various schools. She has taught poetry, writing and theater classes around the US. For example, she has taught poetry at DreamYard, a Bronx-based youth educational nonprofit, and is a member of the DreamYard 2019 Board of Directors. Additionally, Watson has run poetry and theater workshops that aim to help children deal with traumas from various sources (such as natural disasters and sexual assault). Likewise, Watson was a Writer in residence at the Schools and Self Enhancement Inc, a Portland-based nonprofit organization that works with underprivileged youth in the North-Portland area. Watson has also put on professional development workshops for teachers and adult artists.

Writing 
In 2019, Watson celebrated 10 years of being a published writer. Watson has been writing since she was in the second grade, when she wrote a 21-page story. Her first children's book, A Place Where Hurricanes Happen, was published June 22, 2010 and is a product of her nonprofit work in New Orleans after Hurricane Katrina. Watson's second picture book, Harlem's Little Blackbird: The Story of Florence Mills, was published October 23, 2012, and received multiple awards and nominations. Watson's Young Adult novels include This Side of Home (published February 3, 2015), Piecing Me Together (published February 14, 2017), and Watch Us Rise (Feb 12, 2019). Her poem, "Black Like Me," was published by Rethinking Schools, along with other articles and interviews Watson wrote. Her poetry also appears in the Theatre of the Mind and With Hearts Ablaze. Ways to Make Sunshine, a middle-grade novel was published on April 28, 2020.

Watson uses her position as an author to speak up about seeking counseling and therapy when needed.

Watson performed "Roses are Red Women are Blue," a one-woman show, at the Lincoln Center in New York City.

I, Too, Arts Collective 
When Watson first moved to New York and explored Harlem landmarks, she was disappointed to learn that the former home of Harlem Renaissance author Langston Hughes was not open to the public. In 2016, after growing concerned that the historical home may be lost to gentrification, Watson found the current owner and shared her vision to open up the home to visitors. The owner agreed if Watson could afford to lease the brownstone, and in just 30 days, Watson raised the necessary money by starting the fundraising campaign #LangstonsLegacy.

Watson founded the I, Too, Arts Collective named after the famous Langston Hughes' poem, "I, Too." The board of the nonprofit decided that Hughes' former brownstone should not be turned into a museum, but should be a creative space for the Harlem community. Since opening the space to the public in 2017, the collective provides creative arts programs such as poetry workshops and drum classes for children and adults. They also host a range of literary events such as book launch parties and readings.

Watson originally hoped to raise enough money to buy the landmark and renovate the second floor. She wanted to provide fellowships for out-of-town artists to stay in the house in exchange for providing creative workshops to the community.

On November 4, 2019, The I, Too, Arts Collective announced on their website that they will be closing when their lease ends on December 31, 2019. They were unable to come to a new lease agreement with the owner. Their digital archives will remain available on their website. Caleb Watson is her nephew

Selected works 
Watson's first picture book A Place Where Hurricanes Happen was inspired by her work with students who had experienced Hurricane Katrina.  After working with the kids to create their own poetry she wrote this book which follows four kids as they tell about life before, during, and after Hurricane Katrina. She initially wrote it as part of a creative writing assignment while at The New School and was encouraged to publish it by her professor.

Watson's second young adult novel, Piecing Me Together, was published by Bloomsbury in 2017. It tells the story of Jade, a poor African-American teenager at a predominantly white Portland, Oregon high school who struggles with the prejudice of the people surrounding her. It debuted at number nine on the New York Times young adult hardcover bestseller list on March 18, 2018. It also received several starred reviews, won the Coretta Scott King Author Award and the Bank Street Children's Book Committee's Josette Frank Award for fiction, and was a Newbery Honor Book. Watson's relationships with the black women she knew growing up and a 2014 NAACP report exploring struggles exclusive to African-American girls inspired her to write this novel.

Together with the subject's daughter, Ilyasah Shabazz, she co-authored Betty Before X, a fictionalized account of civil rights leader Dr. Betty Shabazz's life in 1945 Detroit prior to meeting Malcolm X.

Watson's third young adult novel, Watch Us Rise, about two best friends who start a women's rights club in their high school, was published by Bloomsbury in 2019. It's co-written with author Ellen Hagan.

For both her first picture book A Place Where Hurricanes Happen and her latest middle grade novel Some Places More Than Others, Watson worked with illustrator Shadra Strickland.

Bibliography 
Picture books

A Place Where Hurricanes Happen, illustrated by Shadra Strickland (Random House, 2010)
Harlem's Little Blackbird: The Story of Florence Mills, illustrated by Christian Robinson (Random House, 2012)
The 1619 Project: Born on the Water, co-written with Nikole Hannah-Jones, illustrated by Nikkolas Smith (Penguin Young Readers, 2021)

Young adult novels

 This Side of Home (Bloomsbury, 2015)
 Piecing Me Together (Bloomsbury, 2017)
Watch Us Rise, co-written with Ellen Hagan (Bloomsbury, 2019)
Love is a Revolution (Bloomsbury, 2021)

Middle Grade novels

What Momma Left Me (Bloomsbury, 2010)
Betty Before X, co-written with Ilyasah Shabazz (Macmillan, 2018)
Some Places More Than Others (Bloomsbury, 2019)
Ways to Make Sunshine (Bloomsbury, 2019)

Contributions

 Forward, The Hunter Maiden: Feminist Folktales from Around the World by Ethel Johnston Phelps (The Feminist Press, 2017)
 "Half a Moon," Black Enough: Stories of Being Young & Black in America, edited by Ibi Zoboi (Balzer + Bray, 2019)
 The (Other) F Word: A Celebration of the Fat and Fierce, edited by Angie Manfredi (Amulet, 2019)
 "Letting Go," Every Body Shines: Sixteen Stories About Living Fabulously Fat, edited by Cassandra Newbould (Bloomsbury YA, 2021)

Awards and Recognitions 

2011: Bank Street Children's Book Committee Best Books of the Year for What Momma Left Me (Bloomsbury, 2010)
2011: Bank Street Children's Book Committee Best Books of the Year for A Place Where Hurricanes Happen, illustrated by Shadra Strickland (Random House, 2010)
2013: Bank Street Children's Book Committee Best Books of the Year for Harlem's Little Blackbird: The Story of Florence Mills, illustrated by Christian Robinson (Random House, 2012)
2016: Bank Street Children's Book Committee Best Books of the Year for This Side of Home (Bloomsbury, 2015)
2018: John Newbery Honor for Piecing Me Together (Bloomsbury, 2017)
2018: Winner, Coretta Scott King Author Award for Piecing Me Together (Bloomsbury, 2017)
2018: Winner of Bank Street Children's Book Committee's Josette Frank Award for fiction and Best Books of the Year with "Outstanding Merit" for Piecing Me Together (Bloomsbury, 2017)
2019: Bank Street Children's Book Committee Best Books of the Year with "Outstanding Merit" for Betty Before X, co-written with Ilyasah Shabazz (Macmillan, 2018)
2019: Bank Street Children's Book Committee Best Books of the Year with "Outstanding Merit" for Black Enough: Stories of Being Young & Black in America, edited by Ibi Zoboi, containing an entry by Renée Watson (Balzer + Bray, 2019)
2020: Bank Street Children's Book Committee Best Books of the Year for Ways to Make Sunshine (Bloomsbury, 2019)
2020: Bank Street Children's Book Committee Best Books of the Year for Some Places More Than Others (Bloomsbury, 2019)
2022: Bank Street Children's Book Committee Best Books of the Year for Love Is a Revolution (Bloomsbury, 2021)
2022: Bank Street Children's Book Committee Best Books of the Year with "Outstanding Merit" for The 1619 Project: Born on the Water co-written with Nikole Hannah-Jones, illustrated by Nikkolas Smith (Penguin Young Readers, 2021)
2022: Bank Street Children's Book Committee Best Books of the Year for Every Body Shines: Sixteen Stories About Living Fabulously Fat, edited by Cassandra Newbould,  containing an entry by Renée Watson (Bloomsbury YA, 2021)

References

External links 

 The Schools and Self Enhancement Inc.
 DreamYard
 I, Too, Arts Collective
 Black Like Me
 Rethinking Schools

Living people
Women writers of young adult literature
21st-century American women writers
21st-century American novelists
African-American novelists
Writers from Portland, Oregon
1978 births
21st-century African-American women writers
21st-century African-American writers
20th-century African-American people
20th-century African-American women
African-American history of Oregon